Union Sportive Salinières Aigues Mortes is a football club based in Aigues-Mortes, France. They play in the Championnat National 3, the fifth tier of French football. The club's colours are blue and white.

The furthest round the club has reached in the Coupe de France is the seventh round, which they have participated in on three occasions in the 21st century.

References

External links 
 Club website

Sport in Gard
Football clubs in Occitania (administrative region)